Duff is an unincorporated community in Patoka Township, Dubois County, in the U.S. state of Indiana.

History
Duff was platted in 1883 by Robert Small. It was likely named for Col. B. B. Edmonston, who had the nickname "Colonel Duff".

A post office was established at Duff in 1868, and remained in operation until it was discontinued in 1955.

Geography

References

Unincorporated communities in Dubois County, Indiana
Unincorporated communities in Indiana
Jasper, Indiana micropolitan area